Dobšice is the name of several locations in the Czech Republic:

 Dobšice (České Budějovice District), a municipality and village in the South Bohemian Region
 Dobšice (Nymburk District), a municipality and village in the Central Bohemian Region
 Dobšice (Znojmo District), a municipality and village in the South Moravian Region